Mohammad Ishak is a Bangladeshi cricketer. He made his List A debut for Agrani Bank Cricket Club in the 2017–18 Dhaka Premier Division Cricket League on 19 February 2018.

References

External links
 

Date of birth missing (living people)
Living people
Bangladeshi cricketers
Agrani Bank Cricket Club cricketers
Place of birth missing (living people)
Year of birth missing (living people)